This lists visual artists and illustrators who are associated with the Star Wars film franchise and derivative works.

Production artists
Colin Cantwell
Doug Chiang
Stuart Freeborn
Joe Johnston
Iain McCaig
Ralph McQuarrie
John Mollo
Brian Muir
Dan Perri
Suzy Rice
Terryl Whitlatch – also wrote and illustrated The Wildlife of Star Wars

Film poster artists
John Berkey
Tom Chantrell
The Brothers Hildebrandt
Tom Jung
Josh Kirby
Drew Struzan

Comics artists
Scott Campbell
John Cassaday
Howard Chaykin
Terry Dodson
Dave Dorman
Ron Frenz
Rick Hoberg
Tom Hodges
Carmine Infantino
Walt Simonson
Al Williamson

Other artists and illustrators

See also

The Art of Star Wars
Star Wars comics
:Category:Star Wars (film franchise) posters
Concept art

References 

Artists
Star Wars
Works based on Star Wars
Science fiction artists
Film artists